The 2017 Pan American Aerobic Gymnastics Championships were held in Bogotá, Colombia, October 27–29, 2017. The competition was organized by the Colombian Gymnastics Federation, and approved by the International Gymnastics Federation.

Participating countries

Medalists

References

Pan American Aerobic Gymnastics Championships
International gymnastics competitions hosted by Colombia
Pan American Aerobic Gymnastics Championships
Pan American Aerobic Gymnastics Championships
Pan American Gymnastics Championships